Charles Connell Conway (April 28, 1886 – September 12, 1968) was an outfielder in Major League Baseball. He played for the Washington Senators in 1911.

References

External links

1886 births
1968 deaths
Major League Baseball outfielders
Washington Senators (1901–1960) players
Youngstown Steelmen players
Baseball players from Youngstown, Ohio